The Constitution Party, formerly the U.S. Taxpayers' Party until 1999, is a political party in the United States that promotes a religious conservative view of the principles and intents of the United States Constitution. The party platform is based on originalist interpretations of the Constitution and shaped by principles which it believes were set forth in the Declaration of Independence, the Bill of Rights, the Constitution and the Bible.

The party was founded by Howard Phillips, a conservative activist, after President George H. W. Bush violated his pledge of "read my lips: no new taxes". During the 1992 and 1996 presidential elections, the party sought to give its presidential nomination to prominent politicians including Pat Buchanan and Ross Perot, but was unsuccessful and instead selected Phillips as its presidential nominee in three successive elections. Michael Peroutka was given the presidential nomination in 2004, followed by Chuck Baldwin in 2008 (although he faced opposition from multiple state affiliates), Virgil Goode in 2012, Darrell Castle in 2016, and Don Blankenship in 2020.

In 2000, Rick Jore became the first member of the party to hold a seat in a state legislature. He was subsequently defeated in the 2000, 2002 and 2004 elections, but was later elected to a state legislature in 2006, the first Constitution Party candidate to do so. In 2002, Greg Moeller became the first member of the party to win a partisan election. The Constitution parties of Minnesota and Colorado have both achieved major party status once.

, the Constitution Party has 20 members who have been elected to city council seats and other municipal offices across the United States. In terms of registered members, the party ranks fifth among national parties in the United States.

History

Formation

During the 1988 presidential election Republican nominee George H. W. Bush stated "read my lips: no new taxes" at the 1988 Republican National Convention. However, Bush violated that pledge during his presidency. Following the breaking of the no new taxes pledge Howard Phillips announced that he would form a third political party called the U.S. Taxpayers' Party.

Phillips formed his new party through the U.S. Taxpayers Alliance, an organization he had founded and which had affiliates in twenty-five states, using its mailing list to announce the formation of a new party. Phillips also attempted to create a coalition with state affiliates of the American Party, but was rejected. The party was accepted into the Coalition for Free and Open Elections alongside the Freedom Socialist Party. The party launched its first petition drive when Jack Perry started a campaign to appear on the 1991 United States special election ballot in Pennsylvania.

1990s

From January 25 to 26, 1997, the national committee of the U.S. Taxpayers' Party convened in Miami, Florida. During their meeting it was proposed to change the name of the party to either "Constitutional" or "Independent American", but the vote was tied 27 to 27 so U.S. Taxpayers' was retained as the party's name. In March 1999, another name change was proposed, with American Independent, American Heritage, Constitutional, Independent American, and American Constitution as possible names, but it was unsuccessful. On September 3, 1999, the national convention of the U.S. Taxpayers' Party was held and during it the name of the party was successfully changed to Constitution. Every state affiliate of the party, except for Nevada and California, changed their names except for in Michigan where the Michigan Secretary of State denied the request. The party is still called the U.S. Taxpayers' Party in Michigan as of 2022.

In 1998, Patricia Becker, the U.S. Taxpayer's nominee for Minnesota state auditor, received over 5% of the popular vote giving the U.S Taxpayers' Party major party status in Minnesota. The party would later hold caucuses during the 2000 presidential election.

1992 presidential election

Members of the party sought to give its presidential nomination to Ross Perot or Pat Buchanan during the 1992 presidential election, but were unsuccessful. In January 1992, Phillips was selected to serve as a tentative presidential candidate for the party until a more prominent candidate wanted the party's presidential nomination. Albion W. Knight Jr. was later selected to serve as the party's tentative vice-presidential nominee.

On April 15, Phillips announced that he would run for the presidency. Phillips accepted the U.S. Taxpayers' Party's presidential nomination at its national convention in New Orleans, Louisiana, which was held from September 4 to 5. In the general election Phillips and Knight placed seventh with 43,400 votes.

Following the 1992 presidential election the U.S. Taxpayers' Party's had ballot qualified state affiliates in California, New Mexico, and South Carolina.

1996 presidential election

In 1996, Phillips sent a memo to conservative Christian leaders including James Dobson, the head of Focus on the Family, stating that anti-abortion candidates like Pat Buchanan, Alan Keyes, or Bob Dornan were unlikely to become the Republican presidential nominee and that they should instead support an anti-abortion third party candidate.

Phillips supported giving the presidential nomination of the U.S. Taxpayers' Party to Buchanan. Tom Staley, Buchanan's campaign chairman in northern Texas, stated that Buchanan would consider accepting the party's nomination if it had ballot access in all fifty states. Phillips was given the party's presidential nomination again at its national convention in San Diego, California, on August 17, 1996, and Herbert Titus was selected to serve as the vice-presidential nominee. In the general election Phillips and Titus placed sixth with 184,820 votes.

2000s
In 2000, a schism occurred within the party, with those who advocated an explicitly religious party leaving to form the Christian Liberty Party, then known as the American Heritage Party.

On February 15, 2000, Rick Jore, a member of the Montana House of Representatives who had attended the 1999 Constitution Party National Convention, announced that he was leaving the Republican Party and joining the Constitution Party. Jore unsuccessfully sought reelection in 2000, and unsuccessfully attempted to win election to the Montana House of Representatives in 2002, and 2004, before winning election to the state house in 2006.

On November 5, 2002, Greg Moeller became the first member of the Constitution Party to win a partisan election when he won election as a Scott Township Trustee in Hamilton County, Iowa, with only a write-in opponent.

In 2006, the Constitution Party of Oregon disaffiliated with the national Constitution Party over disagreements regarding abortion policy. However, despite disaffiliating the Constitution Party of Oregon gave its presidential nomination to Baldwin during the 2008 presidential election. During the 2012 presidential election the party attempted to give its presidential nomination to Ron Paul, but he rejected it and Will Christensen was given the nomination instead. In 2013, the Constitution Party of Oregon affiliated with the Independent American Party.

2000 presidential election

Unlike the 1992 and 1996 presidential elections the U.S. Taxpayers' Party did not seek a prominent politician to give its presidential nomination to. New Hampshire Senator Bob Smith announced that he was leaving the Republican Party on July 13, 1999, and briefly sought the presidential nomination of the Constitution Party before dropping out.

On September 4, 1999, the party selected to give its presidential nomination to Phillips and its vice-presidential nomination to Joseph Sobran. However, on March 31, 2000, Sobran resigned from the ticket due to conflicts between him being a columnist and vice-presidential nominee. On September 2, Curtis Frazier was selected to replace Sobran as the party's vice-presidential nominee. In the general election Phillips and Frazier placed sixth with 98,027 votes.

2004 presidential election

On November 7, 2003, Michael Peroutka announced that he would seek the Constitution Party's presidential nomination and on the same day the party selected him to serve as the stand-in presidential candidate. He won the presidential nominations of the American Independent and Alaskan Independence parties. Peroutka was given the party's presidential nomination and Chuck Baldwin was given the party's vice-presidential nomination.

2008 presidential election

Chuck Baldwin and Alan Keyes sought the Constitution Party's presidential nomination during the 2008 presidential election. At the party's national convention Baldwin defeated Keyes winning the party's presidential nomination and Darrell Castle was selected to serve as the vice-presidential nominee. Baldwin also received the presidential nomination of the Reform Party of Kansas. In the general election they placed sixth with 199,880 votes.

However, the American Independent Party, which had been affiliated with the Constitution since 1991, split into two factions between supports of Baldwin and Keyes. The Secretary of State of California ruled that the presidential ticket of Keyes and Wiley Drake had the nomination of the American Independent Party. In the general election they placed ninth with 47,941 votes.

On September 5, the Constitution Party of Montana submitted a list of presidential electors pledged to Ron Paul for president and Michael Peroutka for vice-president. Paul was aware and that he would not object as long as he did not need to sign any declaration of candidacy. However, Paul later wrote a letter to the Secretary of State of Montana asking for his name to be removed from the ballot as he was nominated without permission, but it was too late to remove his name from the ballot. Paul also appeared on the ballot in Louisiana under the name "Louisiana Taxpayers Party" with Barry Goldwater Jr. as his vice-presidential running mate. Paul later endorsed Baldwin for president. In the general election he placed tenth with 47,512 votes.

2010s

During the 2010 Colorado gubernatorial election the American Constitution Party, the Constitution Party's affiliate in Colorado, gave its gubernatorial nomination to Tom Tancredo. In the general election Tancredo received over 36% of the popular vote, more than the 10% required for major party status in Colorado. During the campaign the American Constitution Party's voter registration doubled from 1,271 to 2,731 voters. Major party status in Colorado gave the party the ability to appoint seventeen members to Colorado state boards and commissions, but the party suffered from complicated campaign finance reports and fines from errors and omissions in the reports which led to a negative bank account balance.

2012 presidential election

On February 21, 2012, Virgil Goode, a former member of the United States House of Representatives who had served as a Democrat, independent, and Republican, announced that he would seek the Constitution Party's presidential nomination. Goode won the nomination at the party's national convention which was held from April 18 to 21, 2012, in Nashville, Tennessee, and Jim Clymer was selected to serve as his vice-presidential running mate. Goode was the first Constitution Party presidential nominee to have held elected federal or state office. In the general election Goode and Clymer placed sixth with 122,417 votes.

The Reform Party of Kansas gave its presidential nomination to Chuck Baldwin and its vice-presidential nomination to Joseph Martin as his vice-presidential running mate. However, the party attempted to give its presidential nomination to Goode, but the attempt to change the nomination was rejected by the Kansas State Objections Board.

2020s

In 2020, the Virginia, Idaho, South Dakota, and Alaska Constitution parties disaffiliated with the national Constitution Party and the Montana Constitution Party disbanded. On April 14, the Constitution Party of Virginia's state committee voted to reaffiliate with the national Constitution Party, but was rejected by the national party on May 2.

2020 presidential election

From October 18 to 19, 2019, a meeting of the Constitution Party's national committee was held. Don Blankenship served as a speaker at the meeting and announced his intention to run for the party's presidential nomination. On May 2, 2020, Blankenship won the party's nomination at its virtual convention and William Mohr was selected to serve as the vice-presidential nominee.

However, the Constitution parties of Virginia and New Mexico instead gave their presidential nominations to Sheila Tittle and the Virginia Constitution Party gave its vice-presidential nomination to Matthew Hehl. The South Carolina Constitution Party chose to not run a presidential candidate during the 2020 presidential election.

Voter registration and notable members

Multiple Republicans, including Virgil Goode, Tom Tancredo, Ellen Craswell, Rick Jore, and Cynthia Davis, have joined the Constitution Party.

On April 2, 2002, Ezola Foster, who had served as the Reform Party of the United States of America's vice-presidential nominee during the 2000 presidential election, left the Reform Party to join the Constitution Party. From 2002 to 2004, she served on the party's national committee.

Jim Gilchrist, the founder of the Minuteman Project, ran for a seat in the United States House of Representatives from California's 48th congressional district in a 2005 special election. He was the nominee of the American Independent Party, when it was affiliated with the Constitution Party, and placed third with 26,507 votes (25.5%). During the campaign Gilchrist had raised more money than all of the Democratic candidates. Gilchrist's 25.5% was the highest percentage of the vote received for a third party candidate in a United States House of Representatives election where both major parties participated since the A Connecticut Party received 26.3% in Connecticut's 1st congressional district in 1994.

Jerome Corsi, who co-authored books with Gilchrist and Ohio Secretary of State Ken Blackwell, considered running for the Constitution Party's presidential nomination during the 2008 presidential election, but declined to seek the nomination. Joe Miller, who ran as the Republican nominee in Alaska's 2010 Senate election, considered running for the Constitution Party's presidential nomination during the 2016 presidential election, but later declined. John Hostettler, who served in the United States House of Representatives from 1994 to 2006 as a Republican, also considered running for the party's presidential nomination in 2016.

On November 18, 2010, Virgil Goode joined the national committee of the Constitution Party. Goode served as a speaker at the Constitution Party's national committee meetings in 2009 and 2012. Goode later served as the party's presidential nominee during the 2012 presidential election.

Platform

Domestic

Electoral College
The Constitution Party's 2016 platform supported retaining the Electoral College and was opposed to establishing a popular vote system to elect the president and vice president of the United States.

Environmental policy
The party believes that "it is our responsibility to be prudent, productive, and efficient stewards of God's natural resources".

The party rejects the scientific consensus on climate change, saying that "globalists are using the global warming threat to gain more control via worldwide sustainable development". According to the party, eminent domain is unlawful because "under no circumstances may the federal government take private property, by means of rules and regulations which preclude or substantially reduce the productive use of the property, even with just compensation".

In regards to energy, the party calls attention to "the continuing need of the United States for a sufficient supply of energy for national security and for the immediate adoption of a policy of free market solutions to achieve energy independence for the United States," and calls for the abolition of the Department of Energy.

Federalism

The party supports the repeal of the Sixteenth Amendment, which allows Congress to tax income derived from interest, dividends, and capital gains, and the Seventeenth Amendment, which requires the direct (popular) election of Senators. The party holds that each state's membership in the Union is voluntary, a stance known as the compact theory.

Fiscal policy
The Constitution Party's 2012 platform called for phasing out social security, and the 2016 platform states that "Social Security is a form of individual welfare not authorized in the Constitution".

The 2012 platform supports reducing the role of the United States federal government through cutting bureaucratic regulation, reducing spending, and replacing the income tax with a tariff-based revenue system supplemented by excise taxes. The party also takes the position that the "imposition [...] of Federal income, payroll, and estate taxes [...] is an unconstitutional Federal assumption of direct taxing authority". The party also supports the prohibition of Fractional-reserve banking and the return to the Gold standard saying quote "The Constitution forbade the States from accepting or using anything other than a Gold and Silver based currency" as stated in the 2016-2020 platform.

Social policy
The party opposes euthanasia, suicide, and abortion, including in cases of rape and incest. The party supports the right of states to administer the death penalty.

The party opposes any government legislation to authorize or define marriage contrary to the Bible, and states that "The law of our Creator defines marriage as the union between one man and one woman". It supports the right for local and state governments to "proscribe offensive sexual behavior" and rejects "the notion that homosexuals, transgenders [sic] or those who are sexually deviant are deserving of legal favor or special protection". The party strongly opposes "adoption by homosexual singles or couples".

The party also opposes pornography, believing that it is "a destructive element of society resulting in significant and real emotional, physical, spiritual and financial costs to individuals, families and communities," and distinguishable from the US citizen's "cherished First Amendment right to free speech." While expressing its belief in the individual responsibility of citizens and corporations, the party maintains that government plays a "vital role" in establishing and maintaining the highest level of decency in America's community standards.

The party opposes all government sponsorship, involvement in, or promotion of gambling. Citing Article 1 Section 8 and Amendment 10, the party opposes federal anti-drug laws, while conceding that the federal government may have a role in limiting the import of drugs.

The Constitution Party believes that charitable giving is most effective when conducted by private parties. Because the authority to administer charity has not been granted to the government in the Constitution, the party maintains that the government has no business being involved in such endeavors. The party opposes federal restrictions on, or subsidization of, medical treatments.

The party supports English as the official language for all governmental business, opposes bilingual ballots, and insists that those who wish to take part in the electoral process and governance of the U.S. be required to read and comprehend basic English as a precondition for citizenship.

In 2009, the Southern Poverty Law Center described the party as a "Patriot Group," a category of parties that "advocate or adhere to extreme anti-government doctrines".

Religion

R. J. Rushdoony, a main figure in Christian reconstructionism, helped write the party's 1992 platform. The 1992 platform stated that "the U.S. Constitution established a republic under God, not a democracy". Christian reconstructionism has been influential in the Constitution Party and calls for the remaking of government and society according to Old Testament Biblical law.

The preamble of the 2004 platform states that the Lordship of Christ Jesus and the Bible are the final authority of law. It also stated that the purpose of the party was to restore American jurisprudence to its biblical and constitutional roots.

Foreign

Trade
The Constitution Party's 2012 platform supports a non-interventionist foreign policy. It advocates reduction and eventual elimination of the role the United States plays in multinational and international organizations such as the United Nations and favors withdrawal of the United States from most treaties, such as NATO, North American Free Trade Agreement (NAFTA), the General Agreement on Tariffs and Trade (GATT) and the World Trade Organization. The party supports protectionist policies in international trade.

The party also believes in exercising a tariff system to counteract the United States' increasingly negative balance of trade.

Immigration policy
The party in 2012 opposed immigration to the United States without government permission, and sought stricter controls on legal immigration. It demanded that the federal government implement an immigration policy disqualifying potential immigrants on grounds of ill health, criminality, low morals, or financial dependence, claiming that they would impose an improper burden on the United States. The party favored a moratorium on future immigration, with exceptions only for extreme cases of necessity, until federal welfare programs have been phased out and a better vetting program is in place.

The party opposes welfare subsidies and other benefits to undocumented immigrants. It rejects the practice of bestowing U.S. citizenship on children born to illegal immigrant parents while in this country (jus soli), and flatly rejects any extension of amnesty to undocumented immigrants. The Constitution Party additionally calls for the use of the United States military to enforce its strict immigration policy.

Electoral results

President

House of Representatives

Senate

Best Results in Major Races

See also 
 Constitution Party National Convention
 Electoral history of the Constitution Party
 List of political parties in the United States
 Paleoconservatism
 Theoconservatism

References
Notes

Bibliography

 
 
 
 
 
 
 
 
 
 W.Va. GOP says it won't appeal ballot ruling; September 28, 2010; The Register-Herald; Summary: "By a margin of just eleven voter signatures, the party succeeds in securing ballot access for U.S. House of Representatives candidate Phil Hudok.  The party then spends the rest of the summer petitioning to gain access for U.S. Senate candidate Jeff Becker to run in the special election for the late Robert C. Byrd's seat, despite looming challenges by the GOP to stop or delay the election".

External links 

 Constitution Party official website

 
1990 establishments in the United States
Anti-immigration politics in the United States
Christian political parties in the United States
Climate change denial
Far-right political parties in the United States
Isolationism
Non-interventionist parties
Organizations that oppose LGBT rights in the United States
Paleoconservative parties in the United States
Political parties established in 1990
Political parties in the United States
Right-wing populism in the United States
Social conservative parties